Chirrip is a locality in the Mount Jeffcott ward of the local government area of the Shire of Buloke, Victoria, Australia.

The post office there opened as 'Chirrup'  on 6 December 1890, and was closed on 29 February 1964.

References